Heliangara ericydes is a moth in the family Autostichidae. It was described by Edward Meyrick in 1916. It is found in Sri Lanka.

The wingspan is about 10 mm. The forewings are bright deep purple, becoming coppery bronze on the dorsal half from the base to beyond the middle. The hindwings are blackish.

References

Moths described in 1916
Autostichinae